Pavillion Agency is a domestic staffing agency based in Manhattan, New York. The agency places nannies, chefs, chauffeurs, butlers, housekeepers, baby nurses, domestic couples, personal assistants and laundresses. In particular, Pavillion Agency provides nannies to high-wealth families that have very specific requirements. For instance, these requirements may include that a nanny can teach Mandarin or other second language, has a background in education, considerable previous nannying experience, or is able to work hours that extend beyond the 40-50 workweek common in the industry. Pavillion Agency is a member of the International Nanny Association.

History 
Pavillion Agency was founded in 1962. In 1979, current Pavillion Agency CEO Keith Greenhouse joined the company; in 1982, Greenhouse's brother and current Pavillion Agency president Cliff Greenhouse also became part of the family business. Current vice president Seth Norman Greenberg joined the company soon after.
The 2000s saw expansion for Pavillion that was owed in part to an increasing primacy placed on personal service by many wealthy families in New York City.

References

External links 

 www.pavillionagency.com

Employment agencies of the United States
Companies based in New York City